Matricide (or maternal homicide) is the act of killing one's own mother.

Known or suspected matricides 
Amastris, queen of Heraclea, was drowned by her two sons in 284 BC.
 Cleopatra III of Egypt was assassinated in 101 BC by order of her son, Ptolemy X, for her conspiracy.
 Ptolemy XI of Egypt had his wife, Berenice III, murdered shortly after their wedding in 80 BC. She was also his stepmother and half-sister.
 In AD 59, the Roman Emperor Nero is said to have ordered the murder of his mother Agrippina the Younger, supposedly because she was conspiring against him.
 Mary Anne Lamb, the mentally ill sister of essayist Charles Lamb, killed their invalid mother during an episode of mania in 1796.
 Sidney Harry Fox, a British man, hanged in 1930 for killing his mother to gain from her insurance.
 Battle of Okinawa, 1945: There are accounts in which Okinawan civilians killed their mothers to prevent them from being captured, raped, tortured, and/or killed by the invading American forces.
 The Parker–Hulme murder case of 1954, in which 16-year-old Pauline Parker bludgeoned her mother Honorah to death with the assistance of Parker's 15-year-old friend Juliet Hulme. This case was dramatized in the 1994 film Heavenly Creatures.
 Jack Gilbert Graham killed his mother along with 43 people by planting a dynamite bomb in his mother's suitcase, which was subsequently loaded aboard United Airlines Flight 629 in 1955.
 Henry Lee Lucas killed his mother in 1960 by stabbing her in the neck.
 Charles Whitman killed his mother and wife before going on his killing spree at the University of Texas at Austin that killed 14 people and wounded 31 others, as part of a shooting rampage from the observation deck of the university's 32-story administrative building on August 1, 1966. He was eventually shot and killed by Austin police.
 John Emil List murdered his mother, wife and his three children on November 9, 1971, making List also guilty of filicide and uxoricide. He was a fugitive for 18 years. He was apprehended on June 1, 1989, after an episode of America's Most Wanted aired. On May 1, 1990, he was sentenced to five life terms in prison.
 Antony Baekeland murdered his mother, Barbara Daly Baekeland, on November 11, 1972, at their luxurious London apartment. She had allegedly raped him in order to "cure" his homosexuality. Savage Grace is a book and a movie based on this event.
 Serial killer Edmund Kemper beat his mother to death in 1973, along with one of his mother's friends, before turning himself in to the police. He had previously committed six sex-murders. Kemper had been psychologically abused by his domineering mother in his youth.
 Ronald DeFeo, Jr. killed his parents and his four siblings in what would later become known as "The Amityville Horror House" (1974)
 Bradford Bishop allegedly bludgeoned his mother, spouse and three children to death in 1976. He was indicted for murders and remains at large.
 Jim Gordon, a session musician who played drums with Eric Clapton band Derek and the Dominos, bludgeoned his mother with a hammer and then stabbed her to death with a butcher's knife in 1983. In May 1984 he was sentenced to sixteen years to life in prison.
 Campo Elías Delgado killed his mother and 28 others in a killing spree that ended with his death in 1986. 
 Susan Cabot, 1950s actress, was beaten to death in 1986 at her Hollywood home by her son Timothy Roman. He was convicted of involuntary manslaughter.
 Michael Robert Ryan murdered his mother in 1987 before going on an armed rampage in Hungerford, England.
 David Brom murdered his mother with an ax in 1988, along with his father, younger brother, and sister.
 Peter Lundin murdered his mother in 1991 in North Carolina. After serving his prison sentence, he moved to Denmark, where he murdered his girlfriend and her two children.
 The Menendez Brothers were convicted during a highly publicized trial in July 1996 for the shotgun killings of their parents in 1989.
 Luke Woodham, Mississippi resident who killed his mother in June 1997 before killing two more and wounding seven others in the Pearl High School shooting. Currently serving a life sentence at the Mississippi State Penitentiary.
 Kip Kinkel (1982– ), an Oregon boy who was convicted of killing both parents as well as killing two students at his school on May 20, 1998.
 Dr. I. Kathleen Hagen, a prominent urologist, killed her mother and her father in August 2000 and was acquitted on the grounds of insanity.
 Yukio Yamaji, a 16-year-old living in Japan, killed his mother in 2000. After his release, he raped and murdered a woman and her sister in 2005. He was executed by hanging in 2009.
 Dipendra of Nepal (1971–2001) is presumed to have massacred much of his family at a royal dinner on June 1, 2001, including his mother Queen Aiswarya, father, brother, and sister. Conspiracies and controversy surrounds this claim.
 Erika di Nardo killed her mother and brother in 2001. See Novi Ligure murder
 Sef Gonzales, an Australian man who killed his father, mother and sister in 2001.
 Sarah Marie Johnson (1987– ), an Idaho girl who was convicted of killing both her parents on the morning of September 2, 2003.
 Daniel Petric fatally shot his mother in 2007.
 Michael Kenneth McLendon began the Geneva County shootings by killing his mother at their home in Alabama.
 Joanne Witt was murdered by her teenaged daughter Tylar and Tylar's boyfriend Steven Colver in June 2009
 Jasmiyah Kaneesha Whitehead (b. 1993) and Tasmiyah Janeesha Whitehead (b. 1993) are identical twins who were convicted in 2014 for the murder of Nikki Whitehead (their mother).
 Jennifer Pan staged a home invasion that led to the November 8, 2010 murder of her mother, Bich Pan.
 Tyler Hadley, perpetrator of the murders of his parents, had killed his mother and father with a hammer in 2011. He was sentenced to life in prison.
 Adam Lanza in the Sandy Hook Elementary School shooting shot and killed his mother along with 20 children, 6 other adults and then himself on December 14, 2012.
 David Rodenbarger murdered his mother Michelle Haskins and 6-year-old sister Jillian Haskins  in February 2013. Rodenbarger suffered from paranoid schizophrenia  and died of suicide while incarcerated. 
 Kvissel murder, October 2014: Danish 15-year-old Lisa Borch and her 29-year-old Iraqi boyfriend Bakhtiar Mohammed Abdullah were convicted of murdering her mother in her sleep.
 Ashlee Martinson killed her mother Jennifer Ayers after Ashlee killed her stepfather with a shotgun
 The murder of Dee Dee Blanchard, June 2015: 19 year-old Gypsy Rose Blanchard and her 26 year-old boyfriend Nicholas Godejon stabbed Gypsy's mother to death while she was sleeping. Dee Dee likely suffered from Munchausen syndrome by proxy.
Jake Davison, August 2021: shot his mother, Maxine, and others, including a three-year-old girl.

See also 
 Avunculicide, the killing of one's uncle
 Filicide, the killing of one's child
 Fratricide, the killing of one's brother
 Infanticide, the killing of an infant
 Mariticide, the killing of one's husband
 Nepoticide, the killing of one's nephew
 Parricide, the killing of one's parents or another close relative
 Patricide, the killing of one's father
 Prolicide, the killing of one's offspring
 Sororicide, the killing of one's sister
 Uxoricide, the killing of one's wife
 Suicide, the killing of oneself

References 

Killings by type